Loch is the Scottish Gaelic and Irish word for a lake or a sea inlet.

Loch may also refer to:

Places
 Loch, Victoria, a town in Australia
 Loch railway station
 Lochans, Dumfries and Galloway, Scotland
 Loch Castle (Eichhofen), a rare example of a Bavarian cave castle
 Mount Loch, a mountain in Australia
 The Loch (Central Park) in Manhattan, New York, United States
 Loch Fyne (Greenland), a fjord in East Greenland

People
 Loch (surname)

Fiction and folklore
 Loch Ness Monster or "Nessie", a supposed aquatic being in Scottish folklore, which reputedly inhabits Loch Ness
 The Loch (novel), a novel by Steve Alten
 The Loch (TV series), a British TV series

Other uses
 Baron Loch, a title in the Peerage of the United Kingdom
 Loch-class frigate, a class of ship built for the Royal Navy and her allies during World War II

See also
 Deloche (disambiguation)
 Loches, a commune in central France
 Loché, an associated commune of Mâcon, France
 Loche (disambiguation)
 List of lochs of Scotland
 Lochia, the vaginal discharge after giving birth